Oleksander Yakovych Shulhyn was a prominent political, public, scientific and cultural figure of Ukraine and the Ukrainian government in exile better known under his French transcription Alexandre Choulguine.

Shulhyn played a key role in establishing the Ministry of Foreign Affairs of Ukraine. He was a member of the Shevchenko Scientific Society, a professor of the Ukrainian Free University in Prague, a member of the Ukrainian delegation at the Paris Peace Conference, 1919 and a representative of Ukrainians in International Refugee Organization after World War II. During the World War II (1939–40 and 1945–46) Shulhyn acted as a head of Ukrainian government in exile.

Biography
Shulhyn was born in the village of Sofyne (Katsapshchyna), Khorol county in Government of Poltava (today Andriivka rural council of Khorol Raion) in the family of a historian and pedagogue Yakiv Shulhyn whose heritage is traced to the Cossack officers (starshina). He is related to Vasily Shulgin. Brother of Oleksander, Volodymyr perished at the Battle of Kruty. Shulhyn initially enrolled at the mathematics-physics department of the Saint Petersburg State University in 1908. In 1910 he transferred to the department of history and philosophy from which Shulhyn graduated in 1915. Later until 1917, he worked at the department as a professor's assistant.

While in Saint Petersburg, Shulhyn joined the Petersburg community of TUP, later switching to the Ukrainian Democratic-Radical Party (later Ukrainian Party of Socialist Federalists). In Petrograd he was a delegate of the Ukrainian National Council at the Petrograd Soviet. During the February Revolution Shulhyn arrived to Kiev joining the Central Council of Ukraine and later its executive committee. From July 1917 through January 30, 1918 he served as a secretary of Inter-ethnic (later Foreign) Affairs. During the time participated in the writing of the Statute of the Higher Administration of Ukraine, and organization of the Congress of peoples of Russia that took place in September 1917 in Kiev.

From July 1918, Shulhyn played a less active role in the government serving for several diplomatic missions of Ukraine in Europe when he was appointed the Ambassador of Ukraine to Bulgaria by the government of the Hetman of Ukraine. In 1919 Shulhyn became a member of the Ukrainian delegation to the Paris Peace Conference, and on November 15, 1920, he headed the Ukrainian delegation at the General Assembly of League of Nations in Geneva. From 1921 Shulhyn headed the Extraordinary diplomatic mission of Ukraine in Paris.

From 1923 to 1927 Shulhyn lived in Paris and was a professor of the Ukrainian Free University and the Ukrainian Higher Pedagogical University of Drahomanov, both in Prague, where he taught history and philosophy. In Prague he revived the Radical-Democratic Party, becoming the head of its Prague committee. In 1926 Shulhyn was appointed the minister of Foreign Affairs of Ukraine in exile, once again leading the Ukrainian foreign policy until 1936. In 1933–38 he headed one of the League of Nations' international unions. Also, from 1929 to 1939 Shulhyn chaired the Main Emigration Council, served as a chief editor of the Paris bi-monthly magazine La Revue de Prométhée (1938–1940) and the Paris weekly magazine Tryzub (1940). During the German occupation of France Shulhyn was jailed in 1940–41.

After World War II in 1946 Shulhyn created the Ukrainian Academic Society in Paris, serving as its chairman until 1960. Also from 1952 to 1960, he was initiator and vice-president of the International Free Academy in Paris, which united the exiled scientists. In 1948–52 Shulhyn represented Ukrainians in the International Refugee Organization, later until 1960 cooperated with the French organization for protection of refugees and stateless at the Ministry of Foreign Affairs of France.

References

External links
  Biography at the Ukrainian Center
 Biography of Shulhyn

1889 births
1960 deaths
People from Poltava Oblast
People from Poltava Governorate
Ukrainian refugees
Members of the Shevchenko Scientific Society
Ukrainian politicians before 1991
Foreign ministers of Ukraine
Prime ministers of the Ukrainian People's Republic
Ambassadors of Ukraine to Bulgaria
Ukrainian Democratic Party (1904) politicians
20th-century Ukrainian politicians
Members of the Ukrainian government in exile